Ready to Love may refer to:

"Ready to Love", song by After School from the "Diva" single
"Ready to Love", song by Katrina Woolverton
"Ready to Love", song by Scott Stapp from The Space Between the Shadows
Ready to Love, an EP by Harmony Samuels
Ready to Love, a 2018 American reality television series on OWN
Ready to Love, a song by Seventeen from the album Your Choice